Peter Tolpat (by 1526 – 1563/1564), of Chichester, Sussex, was an English politician.

Career
He was a Member of Parliament (MP) for Chichester in 1558.

References

1560s deaths
People from Chichester
English MPs 1558
Year of birth uncertain